Farnaq may refer to:
 Farnaq, Delijan
 Farnaq, Khomeyn